Vedaclidine (INN, codenamed LY-297,802, NNC 11-1053) is an experimental analgesic drug which acts as a mixed agonist–antagonist at muscarinic acetylcholine receptors, being a potent and selective agonist for the M1 and M4 subtypes, yet an antagonist at the M2, M3 and M5 subtypes. It is orally active and an effective analgesic over 3× the potency of morphine, with side effects such as salivation and tremor only occurring at many times the effective analgesic dose. Human trials showed little potential for development of dependence or abuse, and research is continuing into possible clinical application in the treatment of neuropathic pain and cancer pain relief.

Synthesis

: The Knoevenagel condensation between 3-Quinuclidone [3731-38-2] (1) & ethyl cyanoacetate [105-56-6] (2) gives Ethyl (1-azabicyclo[2.2.2]octan-3-ylidine)cyanoacetate, CID:54445383 (3). The catalytic hydrogenation of the olefin group gave Ethyl (1-azabicyclo[2.2.2]octan-3-yl)cyanoacetate [141593-50-2] (4). The reaction with sodium in ethanol, followed by addition of isoamylnitrite [110-46-3] led to (1-Azabicyclo[2.2.2]octan-3-yl)hydroxyiminoacetonitrile, CID:73192825 (5). Halogenation with Disulfur dichloride [10025-67-9] in DMF gave 3-(3-Chloroquinuclidine-3-yl)-4-chloro-1,2,5-thiadiazole, CID:9795252 (6).

: Catalytic hydrogenation went on to give 3-Chloro-4-quinuclidin-3-yl-1,2,5-thiadiazole, CID:9942707 (7).

: The reaction with sodium hydrogen sulfide in the presence of potassium carbonate, followed by addition of 1-bromobutane completed the synthesis of Vedaclidine (8).

See also 
 Aceclidine
 Talsaclidine

References 

Analgesics
Muscarinic agonists
Muscarinic antagonists
Quinuclidines
Thiadiazoles
Thioethers
Experimental drugs
Butyl compounds